Gordon Joseph McNaughton (July 31, 1910 – August 6, 1942) was a pitcher in Major League Baseball who played briefly for the Boston Red Sox during the 1932 season. Listed at 6' 1", 190 lb., Leheny batted and threw right-handed. A native of Chicago, Illinois, he attended Loyola University Chicago and Xavier University.

In a six-game career, McNaughton posted a 0–1 record with a 6.43 ERA, including two starts, two games finished, 21 hits allowed,  six strikeouts, 22 walks, and 21.0 innings of work.

McNaughton died in his hometown of Chicago, Illinois at age 32 when he was shot in a hotel lobby by an ex-girlfriend.

See also
Boston Red Sox all-time roster
1932 Boston Red Sox season

References

External links
Baseball Reference

1910 births
1942 deaths
Boston Red Sox players
Major League Baseball pitchers
Loyola Ramblers baseball players
Xavier Musketeers baseball players
Baseball players from Illinois
Male murder victims
Deaths by firearm in Illinois
People murdered in Illinois